1x1, 1×1 or One Times One may refer to:

 1 × 1, 1944 poetry book by E. E. Cummings
 "1x1", song from British rock band Bring Me the Horizon featuring Nova Twins
 One Times One, a 2007 album by Tangerine Dream
 One X One, a 2004 album by Japanese R&B duo Chemistry
 1X1=1 (To Be One),  the debut extended play by South Korean boy group Wanna One

See also
 One by One (disambiguation)
 Web beacon or 1×1 GIF, a technique for web and email tracking